Year 1029 (MXXIX) was a common year starting on Wednesday (link will display the full calendar) of the Julian calendar.

Events 
 By place 
 Europe 
 Prince Pandulf IV of Capua becomes the de facto ruler of southern Italy – holding Capua and Naples himself – this in support with his powerful allies Amalfi, Salerno and Benevento. Only the Duchy of Gaeta remains out of his grasp. 
 Rainulf Drengot, head of a mercenary band of Norman knights, is approached by Duke John V of Gaeta and is persuaded to change sides. With Norman help, Duke Sergius IV recovers Naples from Capuan occupation.
 Duke Bretislav I (Bohemian Achilles) of Bohemia of the Přemyslid Dynasty reconquers Moravia from Poland (approximate date).

 By topic 
 Religion 
 The seat of the Bishopric of Zeitz is moved to Naumburg (Saxony-Anhalt) in Central Germany.

Births 
 January 20 – Alp Arslan (Heroic Lion), sultan of the Seljuk Empire (d. 1072)
 July 5 – Al-Mustansir Billah, caliph of the Fatimid Caliphate (d. 1094)
 Abū Ishāq Ibrāhīm al-Zarqālī, Arab astrologer and astronomer (d. 1087)
 Al-Humaydī, Andalusian scholar and writer of Islamic studies (d. 1095)
 Clement III, antipope of the Catholic Church (approximate date)
 Kaoruko (or Saien-no Kogo), Japanese empress consort (d. 1093)
 Said al-Andalusi, Moorish astronomer and mathematician (d. 1070)
 Ulrich of Zell (or Wulderic), German abbot and saint (d. 1093)

Deaths 
 January 20 – Heonae, Korean queen consort and regent (b. 964)
 January 27 – Unwan (or Unwin), archbishop of Hamburg-Bremen
 May 28 – Herman of Ename, count of Verdun (Lower Lorraine) 
 Abu'l-Qasim Jafar, Buyid statesman and vizier (Fasanjas family)
 Al-Karaji, Persian mathematician and engineer (approximate date)
 Fujiwara no Kinsue, Japanese statesman and courtier (b. 957)
 Fujiwara no Tametoki, Japanese nobleman (approximate date)
 Haakon Ericsson, Norwegian Viking nobleman (approximate date)
 Ibn al-Kattani, Moorish astrologer, poet and physician (b. 951)
 Kushyar Gilani, Persian mathematician and geographer (b. 971) 
 Lu Zongdao, Chinese official and politician (approximate date)
 Salih ibn Mirdas, Arab founder of the Mirdasid Dynasty

References